The BMW G650X was a series of motorcycles produced from 2006 to 2009. The three models were: the G650 Xchallenge, the G650 Xmoto, and the G650 Xcountry. The same updated Rotax engine first seen on the BMW F650 was shared among the three models. Later, BMW got the engine from Loncin in China, while the bikes were assembled in Italy. The single-cylinder, four-stroke, 652cc engine was liquid-cooled and features DOHC. The engine produced 53 hp and 60 Nm of power and torque at 7000 and 5250 RPM respectively. The three models shared all major components and are differentiated by their fairing and wheel sizes, therefore, the models vary in weight.

References

G650X Series
Dual-sport motorcycles
Standard motorcycles
Motorcycles introduced in 2006